Big World Pictures is an American film production company based in Atlanta, GA.  Founded in 2011 with the release of James Bickert's Dear God No. (2011)  Big World specializes in independent films – particularly of the exploitation genre. As of July 2015, the company is filming the sequel to Dear God No titled Frankenstein Created Bikers with an anticipated release in 2016. Big World has selected a cast for the film which includes Laurence R. Harvey, Tristan Risk and Ellie Church and will shoot the entire movie on 35 mm film. On March 28, 2015 the company reached a milestone in a Kickstarter campaign successfully raising over $57,000 in crowd funding from nearly 800 backers to support the film's production.

In-line References

Additional References

External links 
 Big World Pictures

Film production companies of the United States